Linlithgow Academy is a secondary school in Linlithgow, West Lothian, Scotland. The original academy was built in 1900 to a design by James Graham Fairley and replaced an earlier kirk institution, known as "Sang Schule".

History

The present academy and allocated building was completed in 1968 and has been extended several times since. Most notably the building received a large extension to the physical education department to house the gymnasium, fitness suite, gym halls, changing rooms and swimming pool as well as having capacity for an additional three classrooms and a new staff base. During this extension project the Linlithgow Academy building was found to contain asbestos.

The headmaster of the academy, Grant abbot, joined the school in August 2021, having previously been the headmaster of Bathgate academy. There are three active deputy headteachers at Linlithgow Academy; Alison Rutherford, Avril McLean and Alison Bulloch.

The school has a heavy focus on arts, sciences and maths, having received a significant funding boost to upgrade science classrooms as well as introducing a new drama classroom and improving upon media and technological capabilities.

The three houses are 'Watt' which is named after James Watt and has the colour red, 'Bell' which is named after Alexander Graham Bell and has the colour yellow and 'Kelvin' which is named after William Thomson, 1st Baron Kelvin and has the colour green.

Catchment and admissions 
Admissions to Linlithgow Academy are primarily from Linlithgow and a can include a number of smaller villages surrounding the town to the east as far as Winchburgh, some six miles away. As the West Lothian/Falkirk council boundary lies just to the west of Linlithgow Bridge, a relatively small number of pupils attend from this direction. Similarly, high schools in Bathgate to the south, and Bo'ness to the north, limit the natural catchment in those directions.
However, as the school featured prominently in league tables compared to other state schools, especially those nearby, many people from the surrounding area wish their children to attend Linlithgow Academy in preference to their local high school. This, and the increasing population of Linlithgow as a whole in the past 30 years, have led to severe demands on the school's roll. However, over recent years the school roll has been fairly steady with 1230 reported in 2003  and steady at 1192 between 2008-2010.

A review of the Linlithgow Academy catchment area by West Lothian Council was completed in October 2010. Torphichen and Westfield Primary Schools are to be re-zoned into Linlithgow from the 2011 academic year. This change was required due to a new build housing program in Bathgate involving many large developers approved by West Lothian Council over a number of years.

The current roll is mostly from the following local primary schools:

 Linlithgow Primary School 
 Linlithgow Bridge Primary School
 Low Port Primary School
 Springfield Primary School
 Bridgend Primary School
 Winchburgh Primary School
 Torphichen Primary School (from 2011)
 Westfield Primary School (from 2011)

The catchment change proposal includes approved additional building works to Linlithgow Academy.

Media coverage 
Linlithgow Academy was featured in the TV show 'TEENCANTEEN' which aired in early 2013 and featured the then sixth year cooking for the public and learning the importance of business.

Notable alumni
Notable people who attended the school include:
David Fleming, cricketer
James Fleming, cricketer and curler
William Ellis, cricketer
Andrew Johnston, cricketer
Sandy Paris, cricketer
Alex Salmond, Scottish politician and former First Minister
Fern Brady, comedian

References

External links 
 

Secondary schools in West Lothian
Educational institutions established in 1894
1894 establishments in Scotland
Linlithgow